Fourplay is a 2018 Hindi short web series, created by Ekta Kapoor for her video on demand platform ALTBalaji. The web series is about the sexual life of two couples that takes an ugly turn when someone's letter reaches into their lives leading to misunderstandings and small fights.

The series is available for streaming on the ALT Balaji app and its associated websites since its release date.

Plot
The series revolves around two upper class married couples Pooja-Raj and Brinda-Bobby whose married lives take a twist when a love letter intended for Brinda ends up in Pooja's house.

Cast
 Rajesh Khattar
 Vandana Sajnani 
 Gaurav Chopra
 Kashmera Shah
 Kubbra Sait
 Nitin Mirani

List of episodes
 Episode 1: An Erotic Document
 Episode 2: The Contact Point
 Episode 3: Threesome
 Episode 4: The Break-up
 Episode 5: The Young Thingy
 Episode 6: Season Finale: The Climax

References

External links
 Watch Fourplay on ALT Balaji website
 

2018 web series debuts
Hindi-language web series
ALTBalaji original programming
Indian comedy web series